Charles Daniels may refer to:

Charles Daniels (activist) (fl. c. 1914), railway porter
Charles Daniels (New York politician) (1825–1897), U.S. Representative from New York
Charles Daniels (swimmer) (1885–1973), American Olympic competitor
Charles Daniels (tenor) (born 1960), English classical singer
Charles F. Daniels (1849–1932), American baseball umpire
Charles N. Daniels (architect) (1828–1892), American architect active in Minnesota
Charles N. Daniels (music) (1878–1943), composer, occasional lyricist, and music publishing executive
Charles W. Daniels (1943–2019), Justice of the New Mexico Supreme Court
Charles Wilberforce Daniels (1862–1927), British physician and pioneer of tropical medicine

See also
Charlie Daniels (disambiguation)
Charles Daniel (disambiguation)